Baba Gorgor (also Romanized as Bābā Gorgor and Baba Gargar; also known as Baba Gurgar) is a village in Delbaran Rural District, in the north of the Central District of Qorveh County, Kurdistan Province, Iran. At the 2006 census, its population was 12, in 4 families. The village is populated by Azerbaijanis.

References 

Towns and villages in Qorveh County
Azerbaijani settlements in Kurdistan Province